The Hunt Farmstead is a historic farmhouse on a  farmstead at 197 Blackwell Road in the Rosedale section of Hopewell Township on the border with Lawrence Township in Mercer County, New Jersey, United States. It was added to the National Register of Historic Places on October 28, 1988, for its significance in architecture and exploration/settlement. The house is now the headquarters of the Mercer County Park Commission and is located in the Rosedale Park section of the Mercer Meadows park system.

History and description
According to the nomination form, the oldest part of the house was constructed  and was owned by Noah Hunt (–1805). It remained in the Hunt family until 1922, when it was sold to Fernando Blackwell. In 1968, the Blackwell family sold the property to Mercer County. It then became part of Rosedale Park.

See also
National Register of Historic Places listings in Mercer County, New Jersey

References

Hopewell Township, Mercer County, New Jersey
Lawrence Township, Mercer County, New Jersey
National Register of Historic Places in Mercer County, New Jersey
Houses on the National Register of Historic Places in New Jersey
Farms on the National Register of Historic Places in New Jersey
Houses in Mercer County, New Jersey
Farmhouses in the United States
New Jersey Register of Historic Places